Aleksej Nikolić  (born February 21, 1995) is a Slovenian professional basketball player for Germani Brescia of the Italian Lega Basket Serie A (LBA). He is a 1.91 m tall point guard.

Professional career
In November 2011 he joined OKK Spars, and previously played for Zlatorog Laško and Postojna.
 
On February 25, 2013, he signed a four-year contract with OKK Spars.

After rumors in early June, Nikolic had signed officially on July 7, 2015, with German champions Brose Bamberg for four years. He also plays their for farm team Bike-Café Messingschlager Baunach in the second-tier ProA league. He was an early entry candidate for the 2016 NBA draft, but later removed his name from the list.

On July 10, 2018, he signed a three-year contract with Partizan.

On August 9, 2019, he has signed one more year deal with Partizan, then he was loaned to Universo Treviso Basket of the Lega Basket Serie A (LBA). On May 10, 2020, his loan expired and he returned to Partizan.

On July 27, 2021, he has signed with San Pablo Burgos of the Spanish Liga ACB.

On October 14, 2022, he signed with Dinamo Sassari of the Italian Lega Basket Serie A (LBA).

On December 8, 2022, he signed with Germani Brescia of the Italian Lega Basket Serie A (LBA).

Slovenian national team
Nikolić played for Slovenia U-16, U-18 and U-20 national team.

As a member of the senior men's Slovenian national basketball team, Nikolić competed at the FIBA World Cup 2014. He played three games, including the one against the USA.

Personal
Nikolić is of Serb origin. Aleksej is the son of David (originally from Leskovac) and Jana Nikolić. His father was a basketball player, played for Postojna, and was an assistant coach of Slovenian senior national team from 2004 to 2006. His brother Mitja is also a pro basketball player.

References

External links
 Aleksej Nikolić at aba-liga.com

1995 births
Living people
2014 FIBA Basketball World Cup players
ABA League players
Basketball players at the 2020 Summer Olympics
Basketball League of Serbia players
Baunach Young Pikes players
BCM Gravelines players
Brose Bamberg players
CB Miraflores players
Dinamo Sassari players
FIBA EuroBasket-winning players
KK Partizan players
Lega Basket Serie A players
OKK Spars players
Olympic basketball players of Slovenia
Pallacanestro Treviso players
People from Postojna
Point guards
Slovenian expatriate basketball people in France
Slovenian expatriate basketball people in Germany
Slovenian expatriate basketball people in Italy
Slovenian expatriate basketball people in Serbia
Slovenian men's basketball players
Slovenian people of Serbian descent
Universo Treviso Basket players
Slovenian expatriate basketball people in Bosnia and Herzegovina
Slovenian expatriate basketball people in Spain